"Lonely Again" is a 1967 single by Eddy Arnold.  "Lonely Again" went to number one on the country charts for two weeks and spent a total of fifteen weeks on the country chart.

Chart performance

Cover Versions
Nancy Sinatra, Covered that song for the 1967 album Country, My Way.

References

1967 singles
Eddy Arnold songs
Connie Francis songs
Song recordings produced by Chet Atkins
1967 songs
RCA Records singles
Songs written by Jean Chapel